Oregon Racquetball comprises three associations that provide statewide racquetball activities to three different groups. As a whole, Oregon provides the sport of racquetball with nationally recognized programs, events and players. Each association is run separately with its own board of directors, budgets and sponsors.

Oregon Racquetball Association

The Oregon Racquetball Association (ORA) is the state governing body for USA Racquetball, the national governing body of the sport. It has a board of directors and is responsible for sanctioning tournaments throughout the state. Tournaments are held at various  athletic clubs and contain divisions for many skill levels and age/skill levels. The Open division is considered the top division of play. This is followed by Elite A, B, C and D divisions offered for men's singles, women's singles, men's doubles, women's doubles and mixed doubles.

Oregon High School Racquetball League

The Oregon High School Racquetball League (OHSRL) celebrated its 10th Year during the 2004-2005 Season. The league started with three schools and 30 players, and now has more than 350 participants from 24 schools. The season comprises four league matches followed by the State and National Championships.

Oregon and St. Louis, Missouri are considered to have the nation's strongest high school racquetball programs, and the National Championships alternate between the two locations every year. In 2006, the event was held in Salem.

In 2006, Beaverton won the National Team Championship in the boys, girls, and overall divisions. The top three high school teams in the nation in 2005 were from Oregon. Catlin Gabel won its second consecutive National Team Championship, with Beaverton finishing second followed by Sprague. Beaverton has won five National Team Championships (1996, 1997, 1999, 2006, & 2007) in its existence; Sprague won the title in 1998 and North Salem in 2000.

Oregon Junior Racquetball Association
The Oregon Junior Racquetball Association (OJRA) is the crown jewel of junior racquetball programs in the country, if not the world. Like the ORA Tour, the season is made up of events held monthly. The OJRA Tour typically starts in September and runs through April. There is then a regional event, followed by the National Junior Championships in July. In 2005, USA Racquetball National Junior Championships (also called the U.S. Junior Olympics) were held in Portland.

External links 
 Oregon Racquetball Association
 USA Racquetball
 Oregon Highschool Racquetball

References 

Racquetball in the United States
Sports in Oregon